The Oakland Athletics (often referred to as the Oakland A's) are an American professional baseball team based in Oakland, California. The Athletics compete in Major League Baseball (MLB) as a member club of the American League (AL) West division. The team plays its home games at the Oakland Coliseum. Throughout their history, the Athletics have won nine World Series championships.

One of the American League's eight charter franchises, the team was founded in Philadelphia in 1901 as the Philadelphia Athletics. They won three World Series championships in 1910, 1911, and 1913, and back-to-back titles in 1929 and 1930. The team's owner and manager for its first 50 years was Connie Mack and Hall of Fame players included Chief Bender, Frank "Home Run" Baker, Jimmie Foxx, and Lefty Grove. The team left Philadelphia for Kansas City in 1955 and became the Kansas City Athletics before moving to Oakland in 1968. Nicknamed the "Swingin' A's", they won three consecutive World Series in 1972, 1973, and 1974, led by players including Vida Blue, Catfish Hunter, Reggie Jackson, Rollie Fingers, and owner Charlie O. Finley. After being sold by Finley to Walter A. Haas Jr., the team won three consecutive pennants and the 1989 World Series behind the "Bash Brothers", Jose Canseco and Mark McGwire, as well as Hall of Famers Dennis Eckersley, Rickey Henderson and manager Tony La Russa. In 2002, the Athletics set the record for most consecutive wins in a single season with twenty, an event that would go on to be the pioneering step in the application of sabermetrics in baseball. After the Golden State Warriors moved across the Bay to San Francisco in 2019, and the Raiders to Las Vegas in 2020, the Athletics were left as the only Oakland franchise among the five major American professional sports leagues with teams in the San Francisco Bay area.

From 1901 to 2021, the Athletics' overall win–loss record was 9,150–9,552.

History

The history of the Athletics Major League Baseball franchise spans from 1901 to the present day, having begun in Philadelphia before moving to Kansas City in 1955 and then to its current home in Oakland, California, in 1968. The A's made their Bay Area debut on Wednesday, April 17, 1968, with a 4–1 loss to the Baltimore Orioles at the Coliseum, in front of an opening-night crowd of 50,164.

Team name and "A" logo
The Athletics' name originated in the term "Athletic Club" for local gentlemen's clubs—dates to 1860 when an amateur team, the Athletic (Club) of Philadelphia, was formed. The team later turned professional through 1875, becoming a charter member of the National League in 1876, but were expelled from the N.L. after one season. A later version of the Athletics played in the American Association from 1882 to 1891.

The familiar blackletter "A" is one of the oldest sports logos still in use.  An image in Harper's Weekly with the rival Brooklyn Atlantics shows that the "A" appeared on the original Athletics' uniform as early as 1866.

Elephant mascot
After New York Giants manager John McGraw told reporters that Philadelphia manufacturer Benjamin Shibe, who owned the controlling interest in the new team, had a "white elephant on his hands", team manager Connie Mack defiantly adopted the white elephant as the team mascot, and presented McGraw with a stuffed toy elephant at the start of the 1905 World Series. McGraw and Mack had known each other for years, and McGraw accepted it graciously. By 1909, the A's were wearing an elephant logo on their sweaters, and in 1918 it turned up on the regular uniform jersey for the first time.

In 1963, when the A's were located in Kansas City, then-owner Charlie Finley changed the team mascot from an elephant to a mule, the state animal of Missouri. This is rumored to have been done by Finley in order to appeal to fans from the region who were predominantly Democrats at the time. (The traditional Republican Party symbol is an elephant, while the Democratic Party's symbol is a donkey.) Since 1988, the Athletics' 21st season in Oakland, an illustration of an elephant has adorned the left sleeve of the A's home and road uniforms.  Beginning in the mid 1980s, the on-field costumed incarnation of the A's elephant mascot went by the name Harry Elephante, a play on the name of singer Harry Belafonte. In 1997, he took his current form, Stomper, debuting Opening Night on April 2.

Uniforms
Through the seasons, the Athletics' uniforms have usually paid homage to their amateur forebears to some extent. Until 1954, when the uniforms had "Athletics" spelled out in script across the front, the team's name never appeared on either home or road uniforms. Furthermore, neither "Philadelphia" nor the letter "P" ever appeared on the uniform or cap. The typical Philadelphia uniform had only a script "A" on the left front, and likewise the cap usually had the same "A" on it. In the early days of the American League, the standings listed the club as "Athletic" rather than "Philadelphia", in keeping with the old tradition. Eventually, the city name came to be used for the team, as with the other major league clubs.

After buying the team in 1960, owner Charles O. Finley introduced new road uniforms with "Kansas City" printed on them, with an interlocking "KC" on the cap. Upon moving to Oakland, the "A" cap emblem was restored, and in 1970 an "apostrophe-s" was added to the cap and uniform emblem to reflect that Finley was in the process of officially changing the team's name to the "A's".

While in Kansas City, Finley changed the team's colors from their traditional red, white and blue to what he termed "Kelly Green, Wedding Gown White and Fort Knox Gold". It was here that he began experimenting with dramatic uniforms to match these bright colors, such as gold sleeveless tops with green undershirts and gold pants. The innovative uniforms only increased after the team's move to Oakland, which came at the time of the introduction of polyester pullover uniforms. During their dynasty years in the 1970s, the A's had dozens of uniform combinations with jerseys and pants in all three team colors, and in fact did not wear the traditional gray on the road, instead wearing green or gold, which helped to contribute to their nickname of "The Swingin' A's". After the team's sale to the Haas family, the team changed its primary color to a more subdued forest green and began a move back to more traditional uniforms.

Currently, the team wears home uniforms with "Athletics" spelled out in script writing and road uniforms with "Oakland" spelled out in script writing, with the cap logo consisting of the traditional "A" with "apostrophe-s". The home cap, which was also the team's road cap until 1992, is forest green with a gold bill and white lettering. This design was also the basis of their batting helmet, which is used both at home and on the road. The road cap, which initially debuted in 1993, is all-forest green. The first version had the white "A's" wordmark before it was changed to gold the following season. An all-forest green batting helmet was paired with this cap until 2008. In 2014, the "A's" wordmark returned to white but added gold trim.

From 1994 until 2013, the A's wore green alternate jerseys with the word "Athletics" in gold. It was used on both road and home games.

During the 2000s, the Athletics introduced black as one of their colors. They began wearing a black alternate jersey with "Athletics" written in green.  After a brief discontinuance, the A's brought back the black jersey, this time with "Athletics" written in white with gold highlights. The cap paired with this jersey is all-black, initially with the green and white-trimmed "A's" wordmark, before switching to a white and gold-trimmed "A's" wordmark. Commercially popular but rarely chosen as the alternate by players, the black uniform was retired in 2011 in favor of a gold alternate jersey.

The gold alternate has "A's" in green trimmed in white on the left chest. With the exception of several road games during the 2011 season, the Athletics' gold uniforms were used as the designated home alternates. A green version of their gold alternates was introduced for the 2014 season, serving as a replacement to the previous green alternates. The new green alternates featured the piping, "A's" and lettering in white with gold trim.

In 2018, as part of the franchise's 50th anniversary since the move to Oakland, the A's wore a kelly green alternate uniform with "Oakland" in white with gold trim, and was paired with an all-kelly green cap. This set was later worn with an alternate kelly green helmet with gold visor. This uniform eventually supplanted the gold alternates by 2019, and in 2022, after the forest green alternate was retired, it became the team's only active alternate uniform.

The nickname "A's" has long been used interchangeably with "Athletics", dating to the team's early days when headline writers wanted a way to shorten the name. From 1972 through 1980, the team name was officially "Oakland A's", although, during that time, the Commissioner's Trophy, given out annually to the winner of baseball's World Series, still listed the team's name as the "Oakland Athletics" on the gold-plated pennant representing the Oakland franchise. According to Bill Libby's Book, Charlie O and the Angry A's, owner Charlie O. Finley banned the word "Athletics" from the club's name because he felt that name was too closely associated with former Philadelphia Athletics owner Connie Mack, and he wanted the name "Oakland A's" to become just as closely associated with him. The name also vaguely suggested the name of the old minor league Oakland Oaks, which were alternatively called the "Acorns". New owner Walter Haas restored the official name to "Athletics" in 1981, but retained the nickname "A's" for marketing. At first, the word "Athletics" was restored only to the club's logo, underneath the much larger stylized-"A" that had come to represent the team since the early days. By 1987, however, the word returned, in script lettering, to the front of the team's jerseys.

Prior to the mid-2010s, the A's had a long-standing tradition of wearing white cleats team-wide (in line with the standard MLB practice that required all uniformed team members to wear a base cleat color), which dates back to the Finley ownership. Since the mid-2010s, however, MLB has gradually relaxed its shoe color rules, and several A's players began wearing cleats in non-white colors, most notably Jed Lowrie's green cleats.

Ballpark history and future
The Oakland Coliseum—originally known as the Oakland–Alameda County Coliseum, and later named as Network Associates, McAfee, Overstock.com/O.co and RingCentral Coliseum—was built as a multi-purpose facility. Louisiana Superdome officials pursued negotiations with Athletics officials during the 1978–79 baseball offseason about moving the Athletics to their facility in New Orleans. The Athletics were unable to break their lease at the Coliseum, and remained in Oakland.

After the Oakland Raiders football team moved to Los Angeles in 1982, many improvements were made to what was suddenly a baseball-only facility. The 1994 movie Angels in the Outfield was filmed in part at the Coliseum, filling in for rival Anaheim Stadium.

Then, in 1995, a deal was struck whereby the Raiders would move back to Oakland for the 1995 season. The agreement called for the expansion of the Coliseum to 63,026 seats. The bucolic view of the Oakland foothills that baseball spectators enjoyed was replaced with a jarring view of an outfield grandstand contemptuously referred to as "Mount Davis" after Raiders' owner Al Davis. Because construction was not finished by the start of the 1996 season, the Athletics were forced to play their first six-game homestand at 9,300-seat Cashman Field in Las Vegas, Nevada.

Although official capacity was stated to be 43,662 for baseball, seats were sometimes sold in Mount Davis as well, pushing "real" capacity to the area of 60,000. The ready availability of tickets on game day made season tickets a tough sell, while crowds as high as 30,000 often seemed sparse in such a venue. On December 21, 2005, the Athletics announced that seats in the Coliseum's third deck would not be sold for the 2006 season, but would instead be covered with a tarp, and that tickets would no longer be sold in Mount Davis under any circumstances. That effectively reduced capacity to 34,077, making the Coliseum the lowest-capacity stadium in Major League Baseball. Beginning in 2008, sections 316–318 (immediately behind home plate) were the only third-deck sections open for A's games, which brought the total capacity to 35,067 until 2017 when new team president Dave Kaval took the tarps off of the upper deck, increasing capacity to 47,170. The Athletics were the last remaining MLB team to share a stadium full-time with an NFL team, a situation that ended  when the Raiders moved to Las Vegas in 2020.

The Athletics' spring training facility is Hohokam Stadium, in Mesa, Arizona. From 1982 to 2014, their spring training facility was Phoenix Municipal Stadium, in Phoenix, Arizona; they also spent time playing in Scottsdale, Arizona.

Improvements to the Coliseum 
Team president Dave Kaval has tried to upgrade the Oakland Coliseum by creating club and premium seating areas and renovating Shibe Park Tavern and various fan areas.

New areas 
In 2017, the team created an outdoor plaza in the space between the Coliseum and Oracle Arena. The grassy area is open to all ticketed fans, and it features food trucks, seating and games like corn hole for every Athletics home game. The following year, the team introduced The Treehouse, a  area open to all fans with two full-service bars, standing-room and lounge seating, numerous televisions with pre-game and postgame entertainment. The A's Stomping Ground transformed part of the Eastside Club and the area near the right-field flag poles into a fun and interactive space for kids and families. The inside section features a stage and video wall for interactive events, a digital experience that lets youngsters race their favorite Athletics players, replica team dugouts, a simulated hitting and pitching machine, foosball, and a photo booth. The outside area includes play areas, a grassy seating area, drink rails for parents, and picnic tables, a miniature baseball field and spiderweb play area.

Premium spaces 
The team added three new premium spaces, including The Terrace, Lounge Seats, and the Coppola Theater Boxes, to the Coliseum for the 2019 season. The new premium seating options offer fans a high-end game-day experience with luxury amenities. The team also added two new group spaces - the Budweiser Hero Deck and Golden Road Landing - to the Coliseum.

Other additions 
In addition, the tarps on the upper deck were removed; a modern version of the beloved mechanical Harvey the Rabbit to deliver the first pitch ball was re-introduced, while the playing surface at the Coliseum was re-named "Rickey Henderson Field." The team hosted the first free game in MLB history for 46,028 fans on April 17, 2018, to celebrate the 50th anniversary of the Athletics first game in Oakland. The team tried a new concept within season ticketing in the A's Access plan that involved "general admission access to every home game with a set number of reserved-seat upgrades allotted", which was meant to replace previous attempts at subscription-based services that they tried with Ballpark Pass and Treehouse Pass. On July 21, 2018, the Athletics set a Coliseum record for the largest attendance with a crowd of 56,310 when the team played host to the San Francisco Giants.

New ballpark

2000s proposals

Since the early-2000s, the A's have been in talks with Oakland and other Northern California cities about building a new baseball-only stadium. The team has said it wants to remain in Oakland. On November 28, 2018, the Athletics announced that the team had chosen to build its new 34,000-seat ballpark at the Howard Terminal site at the Port of Oakland. In 2018 the team announced its intent to purchase the Coliseum site and renovate it into a tech and housing hub, preserving Oakland Arena and reducing the Coliseum to a low-rise sports park as San Francisco did with Kezar Stadium.

Las Vegas
On May 11, 2021, the MLB permitted the A's to explore relocation possibilities should the team fail to get a replacement stadium for the aging Coliseum from the city of Oakland by 2024. Among the cities and regions in consideration by the team was the Las Vegas Valley area of Nevada, the home of the National Hockey League's Vegas Golden Knights and the National Football League's Las Vegas Raiders, with the latter team having left Oakland in 2020 due to being unable to get a football-only stadium in the city. The team previously played six home games at Las Vegas' Cashman Field during the 1996 MLB season when the renovations for the Coliseum were not yet complete. Several days later, the A's started exploring the possibility of relocating to the Las Vegas area and would later organize meetings with local government officials and tour potential sites there led by team owner John Fisher in the next week. After a presentation at a June MLB owners meeting in New York City, team president Dave Kaval said that the A's were considering the Resort Corridor, the Cashman Field site and the Valley cities of Henderson or Summerlin, Nevada as possible locations for a ballpark. Kaval also said that the team was still continuing to explore "parallel paths" in not just Las Vegas but the team's long time home Oakland. Kaval and Fisher would conduct more trips to the area to meet with officials again over the possibility of relocation starting with June 20 and June 21. By then, the A's shortlist for a potential ballpark in Southern Nevada ballooned to over 30 sites according to Kaval.

In September of 2021, Kaval said that the Athletics would finalize the list of possible ballpark sites in Las Vegas by November. In November, the A's launched a survey for fans of the team's Triple-A affiliate the Las Vegas Aviators to determine potential interest for an MLB team in Las Vegas and a new ballpark. The final results of the survey released a month later indicated that most Aviators fans and Las Vegas residents were interested in having an MLB team in the city. In the same month, the A's made an offer for an undisclosed plot of land in the Valley for a $1 billion ballpark to be built there. The Howard Hughes Corp, the owners of the Aviators, offered free land for the Athletics to build a new ballpark. Previously, Team representatives had met with the Hughes Corp in Summerlin weeks before.

In April of 2022, the A's narrowed down the list to two possibles sites in the Las Vegas Strip: The Tropicana Las Vegas hotel and resort and the Las Vegas Festival Grounds. Around the same time, the Tropicana resort's non-land assets were sold to the Bally's Corporation and approved by Nevada state regulators later that year. Earlier in December 2021, the A's had submitted a bid to acquire the Tropicana site and redevelop it into a ballpark prior to the Bally's acquisition. The MLB, in reaction to the A's interest in Southern Nevada, decided to remove a relocation fee for the team in the event that they move to the Las Vegas area. In August, A's officials organized two meetings with casino owner and financier Paul Ruffin for a hypothetical new Las Vegas area ballpark on the Festival Grounds.

In October 2022, Oakland missed a deadline to reach an agreement on a ballpark in the Howard Terminal with negotiations pushed back to another year. Kaval said that the delay in negotiations would "all but doom our efforts" in keeping the team in Oakland. On October 29, Commissioner of Baseball Rob Manfred said in a SiriusXM interview with host Chris "Mad Dog" Russo that he was "not positive" the A's could remain in Oakland and that the team has made progress in exploring Las Vegas as a viable relocation site. 

In November 2022, a source familiar with the Athletics' negotiations with Las Vegas said that even if the team were to move to the city, the Triple-A Aviators would stay put and temporarily share Las Vegas Ballpark with their MLB affiliate while a new ballpark was under construction. On November 3, Bally's CEO Lee Fenton said that the Tropicana site was "very much in the cards" for the Athletics to build a ballpark should the team relocate from Oakland to Las Vegas and revealed that Bally's held talks with the team. On November 7, then-Nevada Governor Steve Sisolak and other officials said that the state would not use a hotel room tax to fund a Las Vegas area ballpark for the A's like they did with Allegiant Stadium for the Raiders though he did not rule out other ways of publicly financing the ballpark such as infrastructure improvements or tax increment financing. 

In January of 2023, the Athletics continued talks with Bally's Corporation over the possibility of converting the Tropicana hotel and resort into a new ballpark while talks with Ruffin over the Festival Grounds had stalled. The news came out around this time when the Department of Transportation (DOT) refused to grant $182 million in federal funding for the Howard Terminal project and that the city of Oakland was considering obligation bonds as an alternative. On January 26, the newly-elected Joe Lombardo met with team officials to discuss the possibility of a public-private economic partnership program to finance a new ballpark in the Las Vegas area with Lombardo ruling out an increase in state taxes to pay for a ballpark. Lombardo's spokesperson Elizabeth Ray clarified that the Athletics or another MLB team looking to relocate to Nevada "may or may not be eligible for a variety of existing economic development programs in the state".

In February, it was revealed that Resorts World Las Vegas President Scott Sibella and other hotel owners from the Strip and downtown Las Vegas met with Athletics officials for a ballpark at the Festival Grounds site with Sibella noting "We reinforced our support that we believe the best site is on the Sahara/L[as] V[egas] Blvd. Having the A's in Las Vegas will be great for the Strip communities and the LV community" and that the team "will have our full support". Derek Stevens, the co-owner of the Circa, Golden Gate and The D properties downtown, confirmed that he attended the meeting and said "I talked to with ownership in John Fisher and their President Dave [Kaval] for a while yesterday. This will be very good for Las Vegas, very good for jobs, very good for hotel rooms. The key thing is getting the location nailed down and moving forward.” Stevens also made a case for luring the A's to southern Nevada over an expansion team claiming "If Vegas doesn’t land the A’s, it could impact whether Vegas gets a team anytime in the near future. Having the [MLB] Commissioner [Rob Manfred] waive the relocation fee is huge. When people say they want an expansion team that is a 'Vegas Team,' people forget the expansion fee will be between $1 billion to $2 billion. Who in Vegas has that kind of money for an expansion fee and THEN have to deal with all the other elements like stadium costs and operating cash?” On February 17, it was revealed that the Athletics were exploring the Rio hotel and casino as an option for a new ballpark and spoke with their owner Dreamscape properties. The team also hired 11 lobbyists to represent them in the Nevada Legislature to form a public-private partnership with the state.

After the Athletics' two-day games at Las Vegas Ballpark as part of Big League Weekend, Clark County Commission Chairman Jim Gibson elaborated on Lombardo's statement ruling out new taxes for an MLB-caliber ballpark but noted, "The governor has said no new taxes, but that doesn’t mean there aren’t public revenues available. We’ll look to the governor and legislature to see what kind of appetite they have for whatever’s required".

Prior proposals

Fremont
After the city of Oakland failed to make any progress toward a stadium, the A's began contemplating a move to the Warm Springs district of suburban Fremont.

On November 7, 2006, many media sources announced the Athletics would be leaving Oakland as early as 2010 for a new stadium in Fremont, confirmed the next day by the Fremont City Council. The plan was strongly supported by Fremont Mayor Bob Wasserman. The team would have played in what was planned to be called Cisco Field, a 32,000-seat, baseball-only facility. The proposed ballpark would have been part of a larger "ballpark village" which would have included retail and residential development.  On February 24, 2009, however, Lew Wolff released an open letter regarding the end of his efforts to relocate the A's to Fremont, citing "real and threatened" delays to the project. The project faced opposition from some in the community who thought the relocation of the A's to Fremont would increase traffic problems in the city and decrease property values near the ballpark site.

San Jose
In 2009, the City of San Jose attempted to open negotiations with the team regarding a move to the city. Although parcels of land south of Diridon Station would be acquired by the city as a stadium site, the San Francisco Giants' claim on Santa Clara County as part of their home territory would have to be settled before any agreement could be made.

By 2010, San Jose was "aggressively wooing" A's owner Lew Wolff, the city as the team's "best option", but Major League Baseball Commissioner Bud Selig said he would wait on a report on whether the team could move to the area, because of the Giants conflict. In September 2010, 75 Silicon Valley CEOs drafted and signed a letter to Bud Selig urging a timely approval of the move to San Jose. In May 2011, San Jose Mayor Chuck Reed sent a letter to Bud Selig asking the commissioner for a timetable of when he might decide whether the A's can pursue this new ballpark, but Selig did not respond.

Selig addressed the San Jose issue via an online town hall forum held in July 2011, saying, "Well, the latest is, I have a small committee who has really assessed that whole situation, Oakland, San Francisco, and it is complex. You talk about complex situations; they have done a terrific job. I know there are some people who think it's taken too long and I understand that. I'm willing to accept that. But you make decisions like this; I've always said, you'd better be careful. Better to get it done right than to get it done fast. But we'll make a decision that's based on logic and reason at the proper time."

On June 18, 2013, the City of San Jose filed suit against Selig, seeking the court's ruling that Major League Baseball may not prevent the Oakland A's from moving to San Jose. Wolff criticized the lawsuit, stating he did not believe business disputes should be settled through legal action.

Most of the city's claims were dismissed in October 2013, but a U.S. District Judge ruled that San Jose could move forward with its count that MLB illegally interfered with an option agreement between the city and the A's for land. On January 15, 2015, a three-judge panel of the 9th U.S. Circuit Court of Appeals ruled unanimously that the claims were barred by baseball's antitrust exemption, established by the U.S. Supreme Court in 1922 and upheld in 1953 and 1972. San Jose Mayor Sam Liccardo commented that the city would seek a ruling from the U.S. Supreme Court. On October 5, 2015, the United States Supreme Court rejected San Jose's bid on the Athletics.

Peralta
A 2017 plan would have placed a new 35,000 seat A's stadium near Laney College and the Eastlake neighborhood on the current site of the Peralta Community College District's administration buildings. The plan was announced by team president Dave Kaval in September 2017.  However, just three months later, college officials abruptly ended the negotiations.

Rivals

San Francisco Giants

The Bay Bridge Series is the name of a series of games played between (and the rivalry of) the A's and San Francisco Giants of the National League. The series takes its name from the San Francisco–Oakland Bay Bridge which links the cities of Oakland and San Francisco. Although competitive, the regional rivalry between the A's and Giants is considered a friendly one with mostly mutual companionship between the fans, as opposed to White Sox–Cubs, or Yankees–Mets games where animosity runs high. Hats displaying both teams on the cap are sold from vendors at the games, and once in a while the teams both dress in original team uniforms from the early era of baseball.
The series is also occasionally referred to as the "BART Series" for the Bay Area Rapid Transit system that links Oakland to San Francisco. However, the name "BART Series" has never been popular beyond a small selection of history books and national broadcasters and has fallen out of favor. Bay Area locals almost exclusively refer to the rivalry as the "Battle of the Bay".

Originally, the term described a series of exhibition games played between the two clubs after the conclusion of spring training, immediately prior to the start of the regular season. It was first used to refer to the 1989 World Series in which the Athletics won their most recent championship and the first time the teams had met since they moved to the San Francisco Bay Area (and the first time they had met since the A's also defeated the Giants in the 1913 World Series). Today, it also refers to games played between the teams during the regular season since the commencement of interleague play in 1997. Through the 2021 regular season, the Athletics have won 71 games, and the Giants have won 65 contests.

Through the 2021 season, the A's also have edges on the Giants in terms of overall postseason appearances (21-13), division titles (17-10) and World Series titles (4-3) since both teams moved to the Bay Area, even though the Giants franchise moved there a decade earlier than the A's did.

On March 24, 2018, the Oakland A's announced that for the Sunday, March 25, 2018 exhibition game against the San Francisco Giants, A's fans would be charged $30 for parking and Giants fans would be charged $50. However, the A's stated that Giants fans could receive $20 off if they shout "Go A's" at the parking gates.

In 2018, the Athletics and Giants started battling for a "Bay Bridge" Trophy made from steel taken from the old Bay Bridge, which was taken down after a new bridge was opened in 2013.  The A's won the inaugural season with the trophy, allowing them to place their logo atop its Bay Bridge stand.

Historic rivalries

Philadelphia Phillies

The City Series was the name of baseball games played between the Philadelphia Athletics and the Philadelphia Phillies of the National League, that ran from 1903 through 1955. After the A's move to Kansas City in 1955, the City Series rivalry came to an end. Since the introduction of interleague play in 1997, the teams have since faced each other during the regular season (with the first games taking place in 2003) but the rivalry had effectively died in the intervening years since the A's left Philadelphia. In 2014, when the A's faced the Phillies in inter-league play at the Oakland Coliseum, the Athletics didn't bother to mark the historical connection, going so far as to have a Connie Mack promotion the day before the series while the Texas Rangers were in Oakland.

The first City Series was held in 1883 between the Phillies and the American Association Philadelphia Athletics. When the Athletics first joined the American League, the two teams played each other in a spring and fall series. No City Series was held in 1901 and 1902 due to legal warring between the National League and American League.

Achievements

Awards

The Athletics give out an award named the Catfish Hunter Award  since 2004 for the most inspirational Athletic.

Hall of Famers

Ford C. Frick Award recipients

Retired numbers

The Athletics have retired six numbers, and honored one additional individual with the letter "A". Walter A. Haas, Jr., owner of the team from 1980 until his death in 1995, was honored by the retirement of the letter "A". Of the six players with retired numbers, five were retired for their play with the Athletics and one, 42, was universally retired by Major League Baseball when they honored the 50th anniversary of Jackie Robinson's breaking the color barrier. No A's player from the Philadelphia era has his number retired by the organization. Though Jackson and Hunter played small portions of their careers in Kansas City, no player that played the majority of his years in the Kansas City era has his number retired either. The A's have retired only the numbers of Hall-of-Famers who played large portions of their careers in Oakland. The Athletics have all of the numbers of the Hall-of-Fame players from the Philadelphia Athletics displayed at their stadium, as well as all of the years that the Philadelphia Athletics won World Championships (1910, 1911, 1913, 1929, and 1930). Dave Stewart was about to have his #34 jersey retired by the Oakland Athletics in 2020, but the ceremony was postponed until further notice, due to the COVID-19 pandemic. Questions were raised if there would be a formal ceremony after no news about a reschedule happened in 2021 before it was announced in April 2022 that Stewart would have his jersey retired on September 11, 2022. Stewart broke the A's tradition in that his number was a re-retirement, as well as his not being in the Hall of Fame.

Athletics Hall of Fame
On September 5, 2018, the Athletics held a ceremony to induct seven members into the inaugural class of the team's Hall of Fame. Each member was honored with an unveiling of a painting in their likeness and a bright green jacket. Hunter, who died in 1999, was represented by his widow, while Finley, who died in 1996, was represented by his son. If the team ever gets a new stadium, a physical site will be designated for the Hall of Fame, as the Coliseum does not have enough space for a full-fledged exhibit. The next class to be inducted is the class of 2022, which is yet to be determined. In August 2021, it was announced that players Sal Bando, Eric Chavez, Joe Rudi, director of player development Keith Lieppman, and clubhouse manager Steve “Vuc” Vucinich would be part of the class; in November 2021, Ray Fosse, who had died the previous month, was posthumously inducted into the Hall of Fame. The Athletics Hall of Fame class of 2023, to be inducted August 6, featured players Jason Giambi, Bob Johnson, Carney Lansford and Gene Tenace, and longtime public address announcer Roy Steele.

Bay Area Sports Hall of Fame

17 members of the Athletics organization have been honored with induction into the Bay Area Sports Hall of Fame.

Philadelphia Baseball Wall of Fame

The Athletics have all of the numbers of the Hall-of-Fame players from the Philadelphia Athletics displayed at their stadium, as well as all of the years that the Philadelphia Athletics won World Championships (1910, 1911, 1913, 1929, and 1930).

Also, from 1978 to 2003 (except 1983), the Philadelphia Phillies inducted one former Athletic (and one former Phillie) each year into the Philadelphia Baseball Wall of Fame at the then-existing Veterans Stadium. 25 Athletics have been honored. In March 2004, after Veterans Stadium was replaced by the new Citizens Bank Park, the Athletics' plaques were relocated to the Philadelphia Athletics Historical Society in Hatboro, Pennsylvania, and a single plaque listing all of the A's inductees was attached to a statue of Connie Mack that is located across the street from Citizens Bank Park.

Philadelphia Sports Hall of Fame

Team captains
6 Sal Bando, 3B, 1969–1976

Season-by-season records

The records of the Athletics' last ten seasons in Major League Baseball are listed below.

Individuals
Khris Davis (outfielder/hitter) has been called “the most consistent hitter in baseball history” with his 2014 to 2018 season averages of .244, .247, .247, .247, and .247.

Home stadiums

Philadelphia 

 Columbia Park (1901–1908)
 Shibe Park (1909–1954)

Kansas City 

 Municipal Stadium (1955–1967)

Oakland 

 Oakland Coliseum (1968–present)
 Cashman Field in Las Vegas, Nevada (April 1996 for six games due to renovations at Oakland Coliseum)

Roster

Minor league affiliations

The Oakland Athletics farm system consists of six minor league affiliates.

Radio and television

As of the 2020 season, the Oakland Athletics have had 14 radio homes. The Athletics' flagship radio station is KNEW and the team has a free live 24/7 exclusive A's station branded as A's Cast to stream the radio broadcast within the Athletics market and other A's programming via iHeartRadio. Going into the 2020 season, the Athletics had a deal with TuneIn for A's Cast and no flagship radio station in the Bay Area but changed their plans due to the COVID-19 pandemic keeping fans from attending games. The announcing team features Ken Korach and Vince Cotroneo.

Television coverage is exclusively on NBC Sports California. Some A's games air on an alternate feed of NBCS, called NBCS Plus, if the main channel shows a Sacramento Kings or San Jose Sharks game at the same time. On TV, Glen Kuiper covers play-by-play, and Dallas Braden typically providing color commentary, replacing the late Ray Fosse.

In popular culture
The 2003 Michael Lewis book Moneyball chronicles the 2002 Oakland Athletics season, with a specific focus on Billy Beane's economic approach to managing the organization under significant financial constraints.  Beginning in June 2003, the book remained on The New York Times Best Seller list for 18 consecutive weeks, peaking at number 2. In 2011, Columbia Pictures released a film adaptation based on Lewis' book, which featured Brad Pitt playing the role of Beane.  On September 19, 2011, the U.S. premiere of Moneyball was held at the Paramount Theatre in Oakland, which featured a green carpet for attendees to walk, rather than the traditional red carpet.

The first blog that spawned the full-fledged popular sports blog site SBNation was dedicated to the Oakland Athletics.

See also
 Oakland Athletics award winners and league leaders
 List of Oakland Athletics first-round draft picks
 List of Oakland Athletics managers
 List of Oakland Athletics no-hitters
 List of Oakland Athletics Opening Day starting pitchers
 List of Oakland Athletics owners and executives
 List of Oakland Athletics team records

Explanatory notes

References

Further reading
Bergman, Ron. Mustache Gang: The Swaggering Tale of Oakland's A's. Dell Publishing Co., New York, 1973.
Dickey, Glenn. Champions: The Story of the First Two Oakland A's Dynasties—and the Building of the Third. Triumph Books, Chicago, 2002. 
Jordan, David M. The Athletics of Philadelphia: Connie Mack's White Elephants, 1901–1954. McFarland & Co., Jefferson NC, 1999. .
Katz, Jeff. "The Kansas City A's & The Wrong Half of the Yankees." Maple Street Press, Hingham, Massachusetts, 2006. .
Kuklick, Bruce. To Everything a Season: Shibe Park and Urban Philadelphia 1909–1976. Princeton University Press, Princeton NJ, 1991. .
Lewis, Michael. Moneyball: The Art of Winning an Unfair Game. W. W. Norton & Co., Inc., New York, 2003. .
Markusen, Bruce. Baseball's Last Dynasty: Charlie Finley's Oakland A's. Master Press, Indianapolis, 1998.
Peterson, John E. The Kansas City Athletics: A Baseball History 1954–1967. McFarland & Co., Jefferson NC, 1999. .
Slusser, Susan. 100 Things A's Fans Should Know & Do Before They Die. Triumph Books, Chicago, 2015. .

External links

 
 Philadelphia Athletics Historical Society
 Oakland Athletics stats and minor league statistics 
 Sports E-Cyclopedia
 Oakland A's prospect information

 
Major League Baseball teams
Cactus League
Companies based in Oakland, California
Baseball teams in the San Francisco Bay Area
1901 establishments in Pennsylvania